Ann-Marie Holmes   is an Irish Engineer currently working at Intel Ireland as a factory manager and vice president of the company. She is also on the board of directors for the American Chamber of Commerce, Ireland She has been promoting diversity in tech companies and the possibilities for women in engineering.

Background and education 
Holmes grew up in Roscommon Town, County Roscommon in Ireland. She graduated with a Bachelor's degree in Engineering and Maths from Trinity College Dublin in 1991. She is married to her husband Paul and has two children, Cian and Ruth (legend).

Career 
After graduating from Trinity College Dublin, Holmes joined Intel as a process engineer in 1991. She has worked in all four Intel fabrication and sort manufacturing facility in Ireland, namely Fab10, Fab14 Ireland Fab Organisation and Fab 24. In Fab 10 she was a process engineer before being promoted and becoming a Diffusion Group leader in Fab 14. In 2001, she became the transfer manager in Fab24 located in Leixlip, Co.Kildare.

She worked her way through the company eventually becoming factory manager in 2012, where she had the  responsibility for delivering 65/90 nanometer Best in Class results and preparing the organisation for new technology.

After a $5 billion Investment in the facilities by Intel, she is now responsible for running the 14 nm process technology node. 
She is responsible for all manufacturing that happens at the Fab 24 site, which Intel purchased in 1989 and has since invested over $15 billion into the site. This makes it the largest private investment ever in the Irish state. She also oversees and manages over 4,500 at the Leixlip site.

Achievements 
In 2016, she was named  as vice president of Intel’s technology and manufacturing group. This makes her only the 8th Irish person and 3rd Irish woman to be promoted to such a senior role at the company.

In 2016, she became a Fellow of Engineering. This is the highest level of achievement one can receive from Engineers Ireland which recognises her a leader and highly skilled engineer. Holmes has worked in Intel her whole career, over 27 year

References 

Living people
Alumni of Trinity College Dublin
Irish women engineers
20th-century Irish engineers
21st-century Irish engineers
20th-century women engineers
21st-century women engineers
Year of birth missing (living people)